The 2010 Marist Red Foxes football team represented Marist College in the 2010 NCAA Division I FCS football season as a member of the Pioneer Football League (PFL). The Red Foxes were led by 19th-year head coach Jim Parady and played their home games at Tenney Stadium at Leonidoff Field. They finished the season 3–8 overall and 2–6 in PFL play to place in three-way tie for sixth.

Schedule

References

Marist
Marist Red Foxes football seasons
Marist Red Foxes football